Fantasy is the ninth studio album by French band M83, released on 17 March 2023 through Virgin Records France and Mute Records. It was announced on 10 January 2023 alongside the release of the lead single "Oceans Niagara". The band will tour North America and Europe in support of the album from April to August 2023.

Background and recording
Gonzalez worked on the album throughout 2021 with longtime bandmate Joe Berry and producer Justin Meldal-Johnsen, explaining that he wanted a "band feel" and to "make music in a room with musicians and jam around and see what happened", which made "enough material to turn all these jams into an album". Gonzalez further called the album "a gift to [him]self" made "without the pressure of selling records" as he rejected commerciality after the success of Hurry Up, We're Dreaming (2011), which he described as "almost too much" for him. The album also focuses on "the interplay of guitars and synths", which Gonzalez felt is "closer to the energy" of the band's previous album, particularly Before the Dawn Heals Us (2005).

Release
Fantasy was first teased on 29 December 2022 in an 11-second title-less video in 9:16 proportion, uploaded to all of M83's social media accounts, featuring scenes from the music video of the lead single "Oceans Niagara" with "Water Deep" playing in the background. Several days later on 3 January 2023, another 11-second video in 9:16 proportion (this time with a YouTube variation in 16:9), with more scenes from the "Oceans Niagara" music video, was published with the caption "01.10.2023." The single was released with an album and tour announcement on 10 January 2023.

The first six songs on the album were released as an EP called Fantasy – Chapter 1 on 9 February 2023, alongside the announcement of European tour dates.

Tour
At the same time that the album was announced and the first single was released, on the occasion of promoting their new album, a tour of North America was announced. The tour is scheduled to begin on 10 April 2023 in Phoenix, Arizona, and conclude on 20 May 2023 in Guadalajara, Mexico, before moving to Europe from June to August 2023.

Track listing

Personnel
 Anthony Gonzalez – production, engineering
 Justin Meldal-Johnsen – production, engineering
 Dave Cooley – mastering
 Tony Hoffer – mixing
 Mike Schuppan – engineering
 Nick Spezia – orchestral engineering
 Geoff Neal – engineering assistance
 Russell Scarborough – engineering assistance
 Alan Umstead – concertmaster, contractor
 Peter Rotter – contractor

References

2023 albums
Albums produced by Justin Meldal-Johnsen
M83 (band) albums
Mute Records albums